Chaybasar-e Jonubi Rural District is in the Central District of Maku County, West Azerbaijan province, Iran. At the National Census of 2006, its population was 10,148 in 2,004 households. There were 8,684 inhabitants in 2,127 households at the following census of 2011. At the most recent census of 2016, the population of the rural district was 8,520 in 2,270 households. The largest of its 43 villages was Adaghan, with 1,162 people.

References 

Maku County

Rural Districts of West Azerbaijan Province

Populated places in West Azerbaijan Province

Populated places in Maku County